The Samoa national association football team represents Samoa in men's international football and it is controlled by the Football Federation Samoa, the governing body for football in Samoa. Samoa's home ground is Toleafoa J. S. Blatter Soccer Stadium in Apia. It was known as the Western Samoa national football team until 1997.

History

Beginnings (1979–1993)
Although they had not taken part in the first five editions of the South Pacific Games, their geographical proximity to Fiji, host of 1979 South Pacific Games, allowed them to participate for the first time. They lost both group stage matches to Wallis and Futuna 3–1 and Solomon Islands 12–0. Four years later, as hosts of the 1983 edition, they beat American Samoa 3–1, drew 3–3 with Tonga and fell again to Wallis and Futuna, but the results allowed them to advance to the next round. In the quarterfinals, Tahiti eliminated them by beating them 2–0.

Samoa entered qualification for the 1988 Summer Olympics however they were defeated by New Zealand over two legs, losing 7–0 at home before being defeated 12–0 in Auckland. In the playoffs for the next round Samoa lost to Taiwan 5–0 and were eliminated.

Regional Frustrations (1994–2010)

In 1994 they hosted the first edition of the Polynesia Cup, where they beat American Samoa, tied with Tonga and lost to Tahiti to finish in third position. In 1998 they were third again, coming within a point of the Cook Islands in second. Samoa returned to finish third again in the 2000 edition by beating Tonga and American Samoa, but losing to the Cook Islands and Tahiti.

After four tournaments absent, they returned in the 2007 South Pacific Games as hosts. They managed six points by beating Tonga and American Samoa again, but were eliminated after being losing to the Solomon Islands and Vanuatu.

OFC Nations Cup (2011–present) 

In 2011 it hosted the OFC Nations Cup qualifying tournament. There, they beat the Cook Islands 3–2, drew 1–1 with Tonga and defeated American Samoa 1–0 to qualify for the first time in their history. At the championship proper, they were beaten 10–1 by Tahiti, 5–0 by Vanuatu and 9–0 by New Caledonia.

In the 2016 qualifiers, they beat American Samoa 3–2 and lost 1–0 to the Cook Islands. In their final game, the Samoan team defeated Tonga 3–0 and qualified on goal difference, because of American Samoa's 2–0 win over the Cookian team. At the tournament, which took place in Papua New Guinea, the Samoan team lost 4–0 to Tahiti, 7–0 to New Caledonia and 8–0 to the local team. Therefore, they finished in last place in their group without a single point.

Kit sponsorship

Results and fixtures

Due to the COVID-19 pandemic in Oceania, Samoa have not played any matches since they took part in the 2019 Pacific Games.

Coaching staff

Coaching history

 Terry Epa (1996–2001)
 Vic Fernandez (2001–2002)
 Malo Vaga (2002)
 David Brand (2002/2005)
 Rudi Gutendorf (2003)
 Falevi Umutaua (2007)
 Tunoa Lui (2011)
 Malo Vaga (2012–2014)
 Phineas Young (2014–2016)
 Scott Easthope (2016–2020)
 Matt Calcott (2021–present)

Players
The following players were called up for the 2019 Pacific Games.

Caps and goals correct as of 18 July 2019, after the game against Vanuatu.

Player records

Players in bold are still active with Samoa.

Most capped players

Top goalscorers

Competitive record

FIFA World Cup

Oceania Nations Cup

Pacific Games

Head-to-head record
As of 18 July 2019

Includes results as Western Samoa.

References

 
Football in Samoa
Oceanian national association football teams